Zhao Gao (died 207 BC) was a Chinese politician and calligrapher. He was an official of the Qin dynasty of China. Allegedly a eunuch, he served as a close aide to all three rulers of the Qin dynasty – Qin Shi Huang, Qin Er Shi and Ziying – and was regarded as having played an instrumental role in the downfall of the dynasty.

Zhao Gao started his career under Qin Shi Huang as Prefect of the Office for Imperial Carriages (中車府令), an official in charge of managing the palace horse-drawn carriages. During this period of time, he also served as an attendant to Huhai, Qin Shi Huang's youngest son, and tutored him in the laws of the Qin Empire. In 210 BC, after Qin Shi Huang died in Shaqiu (沙丘; south of present-day Dapingtai Village, Guangzong County, Hebei), Zhao Gao and Li Si, the Chancellor, secretly changed the emperor's final edict, which named Fusu, the crown prince, the heir to the throne. In the falsified edict, Fusu was ordered to commit suicide while Huhai was named the new emperor. After Huhai was enthroned as Qin Er Shi, he promoted Zhao Gao to Prefect of the Gentlemen of the Palace (郎中令), an official post whose duties included managing the daily activities in the imperial palace. Zhao Gao, who was highly trusted by Qin Er Shi, instigated the emperor to exterminate his own siblings to consolidate power, and used the opportunity to eliminate his political opponents such as Meng Tian and Meng Yi. He also framed Li Si for treason and had Li Si and his entire family executed, after which he replaced Li Si as Chancellor and monopolised state power. In 207 BC, when rebellions broke out in the lands east of Hangu Pass, Zhao Gao became worried that Qin Er Shi would blame him, so he launched a coup in Wangyi Palace (望夷宮; in Xianyang, near present-day Xi'an, Shaanxi) and assassinated the emperor. Following Qin Er Shi's death, Zhao Gao installed Ziying, Fusu's son (allegedly; there is no firm consensus on what Ziying's relationship to the Qin royal family really is), on the throne. Ziying sent Han Tan (韓談), a eunuch, to assassinate Zhao Gao.

Early life 

Zhao Gao was distantly related to the royal family of the Zhao state of the Warring States period. According to the Records of the Grand Historian, Zhao Gao's parents committed crimes and were punished. His brothers were castrated; it is unclear whether Zhao Gao himself was a eunuch or not. However, Qin Shi Huang valued Zhao Gao since he was learned in criminal law. This was very useful to Qin Shi Huang since he himself was always looking for ways to control the people by laws and punishments. Zhao Gao enjoyed a steady rise in position.

When Zhao was a minor official, he committed a crime punishable by death. Meng Yi was the official in charge of sentencing and he sentenced Zhao to death and removed him from the officials list as instructed by Qin Shi Huang. Zhao was later pardoned by Qin Shi Huang and returned to his official status.

Coup following Qin Shi Huang's death 
At the end of the reign of Qin Shi Huang, Zhao Gao was involved in the death of Meng Tian and his younger brother, Meng Yi. Meng Tian, a reputable general and a supporter of Qin Shi Huang's eldest son, Fusu, was stationed at the northern border, commanding more than 200,000 troops for the inconclusive campaign against the Xiongnu. Following the sudden death of Qin Shi Huang at Shaqiu, Zhao Gao and Li Si, the Chancellor, persuaded the emperor's youngest son, Huhai, to falsify the emperor's will. The fake decree forced Fusu to commit suicide and stripped Meng Tian of his command. Harbouring hatred for the entire Meng family due to his prior sentencing by Meng Yi, Zhao Gao destroyed the Meng brothers by convincing Huhai to issue a decree that forced Meng Tian to commit suicide and execute Meng Yi.

Qin Er Shi, who viewed Zhao Gao as his tutor, became the next Qin emperor.

Two years later, Zhao Gao also killed Li Si, executing him via the "Five Pains" method, Li's own invention. The method consisted of having the victim's nose cut off, cutting off a hand and a foot, then the victim was castrated and finally cut in half in line with the waist. He also had Li Si's entire family exterminated.

In 207 BC, rebellions broke out in the lands east of Hangu Pass. Zhao Gao was afraid that Qin Er Shi might make him responsible for the uprisings. To preempt this, he launched a coup and assassinated Qin Er Shi, and then installed Ziying, Fusu's son, as the new emperor.

Ziying, however, knew that Zhao Gao intended to kill him afterwards to appease the rebels, so he feigned illness on the day of the coronation, which forced Zhao to arrive at his residence to persuade him to attend. The moment Zhao Gao arrived, Ziying ordered a eunuch, Han Tan, to kill Zhao. Zhao Gao's entire clan was exterminated on Ziying's order.

Calling a deer a horse
One chengyu (Chinese idiomatic expression) that is derived from an incident involving Zhao Gao is "point to a deer and call it a horse" or "calling a deer a horse", meaning "deliberate peddling of a falsehood". The Records of the Grand Historian records that Zhao Gao, in an attempt to control the Qin government, devised a loyalty test for court officials using a deer and horse:

Zhao Gao was contemplating treason but was afraid the other officials would not heed his commands, so he decided to test them first. He brought a deer and presented it to the Second Emperor but called it a horse. The Second Emperor laughed and said, "Is the chancellor perhaps mistaken, calling a deer a horse?" Then the emperor questioned those around him. Some remained silent, while some, hoping to ingratiate themselves with Zhao Gao, said it was a horse, and others said it was a deer. Zhao Gao secretly arranged for all those who said it was a deer to be brought before the law and had them executed instantly. Thereafter the officials were all terrified of Zhao Gao. Zhao Gao gained military power as a result of that. (tr. Watson 1993:70)

Alternative viewpoints 
There is a theory that Zhao Gao was a descendant of the royal family of the Zhao state, which was destroyed by the Qin state, and Zhao Gao was seeking revenge on Qin. With Zhao Gao in charge of the Qin government, it was natural that the Qin Empire collapsed in such a short time. In fact, Zhao Gao killed all the sons and daughters of Qin Shi Huang, including the Second Emperor, Huhai. In revenge, Ziying killed Zhao Gao and all of his family members. Thus, Zhao Gao or his brothers have no known descendants. Commentators who hold this view praise him for his part in the destruction of the Qin empire.

The historian Li Kaiyuan (李開元) believes Zhao Gao was not a eunuch at all. He bases this in part on the fact that eunuchs were not allowed to serve as chancellors, which Zhao did.

References 

Records of the Grand Historian, vols. 87 and 88

207 BC deaths
3rd-century BC births
Chinese chancellors
Chinese eunuchs
Chinese folklore
Chinese regicides
Heads of government who were later imprisoned
People executed by the Qin dynasty
Qin dynasty politicians
Qin Shi Huang
Place of birth unknown
Year of birth unknown
Victims of familial execution
Qin dynasty calligraphers